Kawi may refer to:
Kawi language, oldest attested phase of the Javanese language
Kawi script, writing system used across Southeast Asia from the 8th century to around 1500 AD
Kawi (Unicode block), the script in Unicode
 Mount Kawi, a volcano in East Java, Indonesia

See also
 Mount Butak, a volcano adjacent to Mount Kawi
 Kavi (disambiguation)